Richard Somerset Houlston (born 10 July 1956)  is a Professor of Cancer Genomics at the Institute of Cancer Research in London.

Education
Houlston graduated BSc, MB BS from Charing Cross Hospital Medical School, University of London and was subsequently awarded MD and PhD degrees from the University of London and a DSc from Imperial College, London.

Research and career
The main focus of his research is the identification and characterisation of genetic susceptibility to cancer.

Awards and honours
He is a Fellow of the Royal College of Physicians (FRCP) and a Fellow of the Royal College of Pathologists (FRCPath), and was elected a Fellow of the Academy of Medical Sciences (FMedSci) in 2010 and a Fellow of the Royal Society (FRS) in 2017.

References

1956 births
Living people
People educated at St. Bartholomew's School
Alumni of King's College London
Fellows of the Royal Society
Fellows of the Academy of Medical Sciences (United Kingdom)